The Delavine Affair is a 1955 British crime film directed by Douglas Peirce and starring Peter Reynolds, Honor Blackman and Gordon Jackson. It was based on a 1952 novel Winter Wears a Shroud by Robert Chapman. The film was produced as a second feature and shot at Walton Studios and on location around West London, including Kensington and West Brompton. The film's sets were designed by the art director John Stoll.

Plot
Journalist Rex Banner (Peter Reynolds), with the aid of his wife Maxine (Honor Blackman), attempts to solve a jewel robbery, but the criminals try to frame Rex for their murder of a witness.

Cast
 Peter Reynolds as Rex Banner
 Honor Blackman as Maxine Banner
 Gordon Jackson as Florian
 Valerie Vernon as Lola
 Michael Balfour as Sammy
 Peter Neil as Inspector Johnson
 Peter Swanwick as Meyerling
 Laurie Main as Summit
 Katie Johnson as Mrs. Bissett
 Mark Daly as Mr. Bissett
 Anna Turner as Mrs Halloran	
 Mai Bacon as Fanny	
 Hal Osmond as Old Man	
 Vernon Kelso as Macgregor
 Christie Humphrey as Maid

Critical reception
TV Guide gave the film two out of five stars, noting a "Routine crime drama."

References

External links

1955 films
1955 crime films
British crime films
Films based on books
Films shot at Nettlefold Studios
Films shot in London
Films set in London
1950s English-language films
1950s British films
British black-and-white films